"La Vie en rose" is the signature song of popular French singer Édith Piaf, written in 1945, popularized in 1946, and released as a single in 1947. The song became very popular in the US in 1950, when seven versions reached the Billboard charts. These recordings were made by Tony Martin, Paul Weston, Bing Crosby (recorded June 22, 1950), Ralph Flanagan, Victor Young, Dean Martin, and Louis Armstrong.

A version in 1977 by Grace Jones was also a successful international hit. "La Vie en rose" has been covered by many other artists over the years, including a 1977 version by Bette Midler, a 1993 version by Donna Summer, a 2018 version by Lady Gaga, and a 2019 version by Lucy Dacus.  Harry James also recorded a version in 1950. Bing Crosby recorded the song again for his 1953 album Le Bing: Song Hits of Paris.

Background and release
The song's title can be translated as "Life in happy hues", "Life seen through rose-colored glasses", or "Life in rosy hues"; its literal meaning is "Life in Pink."

The lyrics of "La Vie en rose" were written by Édith Piaf for music composed by Louiguy, and is registered with SACEM.  It was probably Robert Chauvigny who completed the music. When Piaf suggested to Marguerite Monnot that she sing the piece, the latter rejected "that foolishness." It was eventually Louiguy who accepted authorship of the music. The song was broadcast live before being recorded. Piaf offered the song to Marianne Michel, who modified the lyrics slightly, changing "les choses" ("things") for "la vie" ("life"). In 1943, Piaf had performed at a nightclub/bordello called "La Vie en Rose." Initially, Piaf's peers and songwriting team did not think the song would be successful, finding it weaker than the rest of her repertoire. Heeding their advice, the singer put the song aside, only to change her mind the next year. It was performed live in concert for the first time in 1946. It became a favorite with audiences. "La Vie en rose" was the song that made Piaf internationally famous, its lyrics expressing the joy of finding true love and appealing to those who had endured the difficult period of World War II.

"La Vie en rose" was released on a 10" single in 1947 by Columbia Records, a division of EMI, with "Un refrain courait dans la rue" making the B-side. It met with a warm reception and sold a million copies in the US. It was the best-selling single of 1948 in Italy, and the ninth best-selling single in Brazil in 1949. Piaf performed the song in the 1948 French movie Neuf garçons, un cœur. The first of her albums to include "La Vie en rose" was the 10" Chansons Parisiennes, released in 1950. It appeared on most of Piaf's subsequent albums, and on numerous greatest hits compilations. It went on to become her signature song and her trademark hit, ranking with "Milord" and "Non, Je Ne Regrette Rien" among her best-known and most recognizable tunes. Encouraged by its success, Piaf wrote eighty more songs in her career.

English lyrics were written by Mack David, and numerous versions were recorded in the US in 1950. The recordings that charted were by Tony Martin (reached the No. 9 position in the Billboard charts), Paul Weston (No. 12 position), Bing Crosby (No. 13 position), Édith Piaf (No. 23 position), Ralph Flanagan (No. 27 position) and Victor Young (No. 27 position). Louis Armstrong recorded C'est si bon and La Vie en rose in New York City with Sy Oliver and his Orchestra on June 26, 1950, which reached the No. 28 position in the Billboard charts. Bing Crosby also recorded the song in French in 1953 for his album Le Bing: Song Hits of Paris. 

More recently actress Ashley Park, as Emily's best friend, Mindy, covered "La Vie en rose" in French a cappella in the Netflix TV show Emily in Paris. It was the #1 downloaded TV song for that week.

Michael Bublé covered the song with Cécile McLorin Salvant for his 2018 album Love.

The song received a Grammy Hall of Fame Award in 1998.

Track listings
 10" Single (1947)
 "La Vie en rose"
 "Un refrain courait dans la rue"

Chart performance

Grace Jones version

Background and release 
Grace Jones covered "La Vie en rose" in 1977 for her debut studio album Portfolio. It was the third and the last single from that album, and at the same time, her first single release on Island Records after having signed with the label.

The single version was heavily edited from its original album version. Jones's fairly radical bossa nova interpretation of Édith Piaf's signature tune became her first international hit single and a staple of her repertoire. It was later performed as part of her 1981 A One Man Show, then the only track from her disco era to be included in the show. In Spain and Mexico the track was billed as "La Vida en Rosa" on the 7" single release, although it was not a Spanish language version of the song. Jones's recording of "La Vie en rose" was later re-released a number of times in the early 1980s and finally reached #12 in the UK charts when re-released as a double A-side with "Pull Up to the Bumper" in 1985. The single was certified Gold in France and Italy.

Jones said about the song, "That's a very special song to me. Oh God, I cry every time I sing it. I had quite a few French lovers, so every time I sing it I think about them."

The music video for the song was made using the chroma key technique. It presents Jones dancing and singing the song with the famous 1978 montage of herself in the background, which was later used for the cover of her 1985 Island Life compilation. The video begins with Jones wearing a rose-patterned coat. Having removed it, the singer dances in a scanty gold dress which reveals her right nipple as well as black underwear.

Numerous versions of Jones’s "La Vie en rose" spawned numerous songs that sampled parts of the song, such as "Beach Walk" by Whitewoods, which sampled the live version without acquiring  copyright permission until 2019, when Whitewoods released a video stating that their track has acquired permission.

Chart performance

Certifications

References

External links
 

1945 songs
1947 singles
1993 singles
Dalida songs
Bette Midler songs
Donna Summer songs
Édith Piaf songs
La Toya Jackson songs
Louis Armstrong songs
Madonna songs
French songs
Grammy Hall of Fame Award recipients
Songs with lyrics by Édith Piaf
1940s jazz standards
Columbia Records singles
Island Records singles